The Krzysztof Kieślowski Film School (also known as Katowice Film School) is a polish film and television school established in 1978 and based in Katowice, Poland. It is a full-time film school and offers MA courses in Directing, Cinematography and Photography, Film and Television Producing. Kieślowski Film School is allowed to award PhD degree. One of its first tutors was Krzysztof Kieślowski. It is a part of University of Silesia.

In 2017 film school was moved to brand new building at Pawła street no 3 in the downtown of Katowice. The building won the Brick Award and was shortlisted to the Mies Van Der Rohe Award in 2019.

Students from Krzysztof Kieślowski Film School were awarded nine times at the Camerimage Festival, including four Golden Tadpoles, two Silver Tadpoles, two Bronze Tadpoles and one Blue Tadpole for the best film of the decade.

Authorities

Dean Assoc. Prof. Krystyna Doktorowicz, Professor of the University of Silesia
Deputy Dean for Education and Student Affairs Ernest Wilde, MA
Deputy Dean for Internationalisation and Organisation Dr Eng. Olaf Flak
Deputy Dean for the Arts Full Prof. Jerzy Łukaszewicz

Structure
Institute of Film and Theatre Arts - Director of the Institute Dr Jarosław Świerszcz

Research and artistic activity
Main research areas:
 Film and television directing, cinematography
 Artistic photography
 Media Studies, audiovisual law
 Cinema and film production

Courses of studies

Full-time BA courses 
 Film and Television Directing
 Film and Television Producing

Full-time MA courses 
 Film and Television Directing
 Cinematography, Directing and Art Photography (long-term)
 Film and Television Producing
 Creative Management in New Media (lectures in English)

Part-time BA and MA courses 
 Film and Television Producing

Tutors

Maciej Pieprzyca
Michał Rosa
Bartosz Konopka
Magdalena Piekorz
Andrzej Jakimowski
Marcin Koszałka
Adam Sikora
Bogdan Dziworski
Jerzy Łukaszewicz
Andrzej Fidyk
Filip Bajon
Krzysztof Zanussi

Alumni

Directors

Urszula Antoniak
Maciej Dejczer
Magdalena Holland-Łazarkiewicz
Andrzej Jakimowski
Bartosz Konopka (Academy Award nomination in 2010)
Jan P. Matuszyński
Magdalena Piekorz
Maciej Pieprzyca
Michał Rosa
Agnieszka Smoczyńska
Marcin Wrona
Maria Zmarz-Koczanowicz

Cinematographers
Paweł Dyllus
Paweł Flis
Marcin Koszałka

Other names

Former name  
 1978-2019 - Krzysztof Kieślowski Faculty of Radio and Television at the University of Silesia in Katowice (Polish: Wydział Radia i Telewizji im. Krzysztofa Kieślowskiego Uniwersytetu Śląskiego w Katowicach)

Common names 
 Katowice Film School
 Silesian Film School

See also

 Cinema of Poland
 Film
 Film school
 List of film schools
 Glossary of motion picture terms

References

External links
 
 

 
Film schools in Poland
Art schools in Poland
Educational institutions established in 1978
1978 establishments in Poland
Film in Katowice
Education in Katowice
Mass media in Katowice